Vanhanen is a Finnish surname. Notable people with the surname include:

 Tatu Vanhanen (1929–2015), Finnish political scientist and author
 Matti Vanhanen (born 1955), Finnish politician
 Ella Vanhanen (born 1993), Finnish football player

Finnish-language surnames